The Journal of Structural Geology is a monthly peer-reviewed scientific journal covering on the field of structural geology. It is published by Elsevier and the editor-in-chief is G. Ian Alsop (University of Aberdeen). According to the Journal Citation Reports, the journal has a 2014 impact factor of 2.884.

References

External links 
 

English-language journals
Geology journals
Structural geology
Monthly journals
Publications established in 1979
Elsevier academic journals